The 33rd annual 2007 Metro Manila Film Festival ran from December 25, 2007 to January 7, 2008.

Maricel Soriano, Jinggoy Estrada and the movie, Resiklo topped the 2007 Metro Manila Film Festival. Soriano and Estrada took home the Best Actress and Best Actor awards for their performances in the films Bahay Kubo: A Pinoy Mano Po! and Katas ng Saudi respectively. Ramon "Bong" Revilla, Jr.'s Resiklo won eight awards including the Best Picture and Best Supporting Actor for Roi Vinzon among others. Second-consecutive winners Nash Aguas and Jose Javier Reyes received the Best Child Performer and Best Screenplay respectively.

Other awardees include Best Director for Cesar Apolinario, Metro Manila Film Festival Award for Best Supporting Actress for Bahay Kubo: A Pinoy Mano Po!s Eugene Domingo, and Gatpuno Antonio J. Villegas Cultural Awards for both Bahay Kubo: A Pinoy Mano Po! and Katas ng Saudi.

Entries
There are two batches of films in competition, the first batch was shown from December 25, while the second batch was shown on January 1, 2008.

Winners and nominees
Winners are listed first and highlighted in boldface'.

Festival awards

Multiple awards

Ceremony Information
The awards night ended in less than an hour after festival organizers decided to just announce the winners without even mentioning the nominees for each category. The organizers explained that it had to be rushed and had to end at exactly 9pm because a concert, featuring singer Lani Misalucha, was scheduled right after the awards ceremonies.

Box office gross

References

External links

Metro Manila Film Festival
MMFF
MMFF
MMFF
MMFF
MMFF